Spanish succession may refer to:
List of heads of state of Spain
War of the Spanish Succession
Succession to the Spanish throne